Estadio Municipal de Fútbol El Toralín is a football stadium in Ponferrada, Spain.  It is currently used mostly for football matches and is the home ground of SD Ponferradina.  The stadium holds 8,400 and was built in 2000.

History 
The stadium was officially inaugurated on September 5, 2000, in a friendly match between SD Ponferradina and RC Celta de Vigo which ended up in 0:2.

International matches
The stadium hosted several Spain U-21 official fixtures, with victory for the Spaniards in all matches.

References

External links
Soccerway
Estadios de España 

Sports venues in Ponferrada
SD Ponferradina
Football venues in Castile and León